X Factor is a Polish television music competition to find new singing talent. The fourth series began airing on TVN on 1 March 2014 and ended on 31 May 2014.  Kuba Wojewódzki, Tatiana Okupnik and Czesław Mozil returned as judges. Ewa Farna joined the judging panel as the fourth judge. Patricia Kazadi presents the show.

This series saw a number of changes to the format, most notably the possibility of auditioning for bands with not all members singing and the increase in the number of categories from three to four, resulting from the division of the 16-24s category into separate male and female categories.

The winner of the series was Artem Furman, who received a recording contract with Sony Music, PLN 100,000, and a car. Marta Bijan, the runner-up of the competition, was given a special prize funded by MTV Poland, who will produce her debut music video. Anna Tacikowska took the third place.

Judges and presenter

After the end of the third series, media speculated about changes in the judging panel for the possible next series.  Show's director Wojciech Iwański spoke about possible changes to the format, including extending the panel.

On 14 November 2013 it was announced that the judging panel would be extended as the three judges from the previous series, including Kuba Wojewódzki, Tatiana Okupnik and Czesław Mozil, would be joined by a fourth judge. Singers Ewa Farna, Sylwia Grzeszczak, Ewelina Lisowska, Monika Brodka, Katarzyna Nosowska and Margaret were rumoured to join the panel. Later that day, Ewa Farna was confirmed by TVN as the new judge.

However, on 3 December 2013 Ewa Farna posted a note on her Facebook page saying she could not confirm or deny anything yet as the final decision regarding her participation in the show had not been made yet. Later, TVN admitted that negotiations with Farna's management were still in progress. On 20 December 2013, Farna announced that she had decided to take part in the series and was about to sign her contract.

Patricia Kazadi returned to present the show for her second series.

Selection process

Auditions

Open auditions
Open auditions in front of the show's producers began in Hotel Mercure Wrocław Centre in Wrocław on 7 December 2013 and continued in Zabrze (House of Music and Dance) on 8 December and Gdańsk (Hotel Mercure Gdańsk Old Town) on 13 December, before concluding in Warsaw (Torwar Hall) on 15 December.

Judges' auditions
Judges' auditions were held in House of Music and Dance in Zabrze in two parts: from 9 to 11 January 2014 and from 23 to 25 January 2014. Each day of auditions consisted of two sessions: afternoon and evening.

Auditionees needed a minimum of three "yes" votes (previously two) from the judges to proceed to the next round.

Bootcamp
Bootcamp stage of the competition took place in Transcolor Studio in Szeligi over two days, on 3 and 4 February 2014. In a change to the usual format, the judges were allocated their categories before bootcamp. Farna has the girls, Mozil has the boys, Okupnik has the over 25s and Wojewódzki has the groups and bands. On the first day of bootcamp, 118 acts who successfully got through the auditions, were put into groups of three or four within their category. They had to perform within that group, and the category judge, after being advised by other judges, would then decide who would continue. The contestants could choose among several songs, including "Dear Darlin'" by Olly Murs, "Love Me Again" by John Newman and "Sweet Dreams" by Beyoncé. At the end of the day, 40 contestants remained, who had to prepare their solo bootcamp performance overnight.

There was then a change in the format, that followed the idea of 'musical chairs', which was first introduced in the original British series in 2013. It involved the judges choosing the acts to advance to judges' houses immediately after their bootcamp performance, instead of waiting until everyone had performed. Each judge had five places to their judges house, and they granted a 'seat' to the performers they wanted to advance in their category. However, if a judge already chose five acts for their category, they could replace them if they preferred a later performer. Selection of songs included "Beneath Your Beautiful" by Labrinth and Emeli Sande, "She's the One" by World Party, "Who Wants To Live Forever" by Queen, "You Are So Beautiful" by Joe Cocker, "I Believe I Can Fly" by R. Kelly, "Billie Jean" by Michael Jackson, "Wake Me Up" by Avicii, "Stacja Warszawa" by Lady Pank, "I Wanna Dance with Somebody (Who Loves Me)" by Whitney Houston, "Firework" by Katy Perry, "Znak" by Ewa Farna and "Alone Again" by Alyssa Reid. Bootcamp was broadcast over two episodes, each of 90 minutes, on 5 and 12 April.

The 20 successful acts were:
Boys: Artem Furman, Kacper Gołda, Jakub Jonkisz, Kuba Jurzyk, Aleksander Kamiński
Girls: Magdalena Bal, Marta Bijan, Agata Dziarmagowska, Beata Spychalska, Daria Zawiałow
Over 25s: Karolina Duszkiewicz, Małgorzata Markowska, Joao de Sousa, Anna Tacikowska, Małgorzata Uściłowska 
Groups and Bands: Cała Góra Barwinków, Hatbreakers, Pop It Up, Poprzytula, Trzynasta w Samo Południe

Judges' houses
Judges' houses took place in March and April. Each judge took the remaining members of their category to an abroad location, and had guests to assist them in their decisions. Farna's part was filmed on 3 and 4 March in Prague, Czech Republic, where she mentored the Girls, and was joined by Jakub Badach. Okupnik took the Over 25s to San Gimignano, Italy on 1 and 2 April and was assisted by Andrzej Piaseczny. Wojewódzki mentored the Groups and Bands in Alvernia Studios in Alwernia near Kraków with his guest judge Tomasz "Titus" Pukacki of Acid Drinkers. Mozil took the Boys to Volterra, Italy and was aided by Stanisław Sojka. Judges' houses was broadcast on 19 April.

Contestants
The top 12 contestants were announced during the episode broadcast on 19 April 2014.

Key:
 – Winner
 – Runner up
 – Third Place

Live Shows
The live shows began on 26 April 2014.

Results summary

Colour key

Live show details

Week 1 (26 April)
Theme: Songs chosen by the contestants
Musical guests: Grzegorz Hyży ("Na Chwilę")

Judges' votes to save
 Mozil: Artem Furman - backed his own act
 Okupnik: Joao de Sousa - backed her own act
 Farna: Artem Furman - gave no reason, but praised both final showdown performances
 Wojewódzki: Artem Furman - gave no reason

Week 2 (3 May)
Theme: Songs from the 1980s
Musical guests: Ewa Farna ("Ulubiona Rzecz"/"Znak") 

Judges' votes to save
 Wojewódzki: Hatbreakers - backed his own act
 Okupnik: Hatbreakers - praised Zawiałow, but decided to back Hatbreakers
 Farna: Daria Zawiałow - backed her own act, but stated that Hatbreakers were her favourites from the beginning 
 Mozil: Hatbreakers - thought that Hatbreakers showed new quality of cover songs

Week 3 (10 May)
Theme:  Songs from years 2013-2014

Judges' votes to save
 Wojewódzki: Hatbreakers - backed his own act
 Farna: Marta Bijan - backed her own act
 Mozil: Marta Bijan - due to the fact that Hatbreakers were in bottom three for the second time in a row
 Okupnik: Hatbreakers - gave no reason
With the acts in the sing-off receiving two votes each, the result was deadlocked and reverted to the earlier public vote. Hatbreakers were eliminated as the act with fewer public votes.

Week 4 (17 May)
Themes: Songs chosen by mentors; Polish songs
Musical guest: Tatiana Okupnik ("Oczy Na Zapałki")

Judges' votes to save
Mozil: Jakub Jonkisz - backed his own act
Okupnik: Trzynasta w Samo Południe - based on the final showdown performance
Wojewódzki: Trzynasta w Samo Południe - backed his own act
Farna: Jakub Jonkisz - thought it would be easier for Trzynasta w Samo Południe to launch their career, whilst Jonkisz needs to stay in the competition

With the acts in the sing-off receiving two votes each, the result was deadlocked and reverted to the earlier public vote. Trzynasta w Samo Południe were eliminated as the act with fewer public votes.

Week 5: Semi-final (24 May)
 Themes: Songs by The Beatles; The Greatest Hits 

Judges' votes to save
Mozil: Jakub Jonkisz - backed his own act
Farna: Marta Bijan - backed her own act
Wojewódzki: Marta Bijan - stated that she was his favourite from the beginning
Okupnik: Marta Bijan - thought she made the biggest progress throughout the competition

Week 6: Final (31 May)
Themes: Audition songs; favourite performance; celebrity duets
Group performance: "Get Lucky" (performed by all finalists)

Ratings

 Includes advert breaks

References

X Factor (Polish TV series)
2014 Polish television seasons
Poland 04